1,4-Diamino-2,3-dihydroanthraquinone is an anthraquinone dye used with Disperse Red 9 in colored smoke to introduce a violet color. It is also used in dyes and marine flares.

Synthesis 
1,4-Diaminoanthraquinone is reacted with sodium dithionite to produce 1,4-diamino-2,3-dihydroanthraquinone.

References

Anthraquinone dyes
Aromatic amines